The 2021 Albanian Supercup was the 28th edition of the Albanian Supercup, an annual Albanian football match. The teams were decided by taking the previous season's Kategoria Superiore champions and the winners of the Albanian Cup.

The match was contested by Teuta, champions of the 2020–21 Kategoria Superiore, and Vllaznia, the 2020–21 Albanian Cup winners.

Details

See also
2020–21 Kategoria Superiore
2020–21 Albanian Cup

References

2021
Supercup
Albanian Supercup, 2021
August 2021 sports events in Europe